Xiaoli may refer to:

 Xiaoli, Hebei (小里镇), town in Rongcheng County
 Xiaoli, Shandong (孝里镇), town in Changqing District, Jinan